The EMD FP9 is an American , B-B dual-service passenger and freight-hauling diesel locomotive that was produced between February 1954 and December 1959 by General Motors Electro-Motive Division, and General Motors Diesel. Final assembly was at GM-EMD's La Grange, Illinois plant, except for Canadian orders, which were assembled by Canadian subsidiary GMD at London, Ontario. The FP9 was essentially EMD's F9 locomotive extended by four feet to give greater steam generator and water capacity for hauling passenger trains. A total of 90 cab-equipped lead A units were built; unlike the freight series, no cabless booster B units were sold. Regular F9B units were sometimes used with FP9 A units, since they, lacking cabs, had more room for water and steam generators. The FP9 and its predecessor, the FP7, were offshoots of GM-EMD's highly successful F-unit series of cab unit diesel locomotives.

Original buyers

Locomotives built by EMD at La Grange, Illinois

Locomotives built by GMD at London, Ontario

See also 

VIA FP9ARM
List of GM-EMD locomotives
List of GMD Locomotives

References

Bibliography

External links 

 Trainweb.com (2004) EMD F9A, F9B, FP9, FL9 Order Numbers, retrieved on January 4, 2004.
 EMD FP9 Data Sheet

B-B locomotives
F09P
F09P
Passenger locomotives
Diesel-electric locomotives of the United States
Railway locomotives introduced in 1954
Standard gauge locomotives of the United States
Diesel-electric locomotives of Canada
Diesel-electric locomotives of Saudi Arabia
Standard gauge locomotives of Canada
Standard gauge locomotives of Mexico
Standard gauge locomotives of Saudi Arabia
Diesel-electric locomotives of Mexico
Streamlined diesel locomotives